Tamaha can stand for:

 Tamaha (Dakota scout) (1776–1864), Mdewakanton Dakota who supported the United States in the War of 1812
Tamaha, Oklahoma, United States, a town
 Tamahā (Tonga), holy child, the title for the sister of the Tui Tonga, a traditional dynasty in Tonga
 Tsamai language, also known as Tamaha, spoken in Ethiopia